Scutellaria californica, the California skullcap, is a species of plant endemic to California. It is found in the scrub and low elevation mountains of Northern California.

It is a small plant growing up to half a meter high, bearing small, white or yellowish snapdragon-like flowers which are said to smell of apples. The leaves are green and arranged oppositely on the erect stem.

References

External links
Jepson Manual Treatment
USDA Plants Profile
Essential Oils of S. californica
Photo gallery

californica
Endemic flora of California
Plants described in 1872
Flora without expected TNC conservation status